Cotmanhay is a village in Derbyshire, England and used to be a Viking settlement. Cotmanhay is in the Erewash Borough Council area, north of Ilkeston. Recently a flint implement was found at the edge of Cotmanhay Wood, indicating that the area was inhabited several thousand years BC. The Erewash ward population at the 2011 Census was 4,531, the area is also home to local Erewash celebrity James Currie Jr.

The neighbourhood's two main industries were textiles and coal mining, the latter from 1848 until 1880.

The 2019 Multiple deprivation index found the area around Skeavingtons Lane to be the most deprived area in Derbyshire.

See also
List of places in Derbyshire

References

External links

Cotmanhay Neighbourhood Management
Cotmanhay Junior School

Villages in Derbyshire
Borough of Erewash